Prosper Braeckman (25 September 1888 – 1 October 1920) was a Belgian footballer. He played in eight matches for the Belgium national football team from 1909 to 1913.

References

External links
 

1888 births
1920 deaths
Belgian footballers
Belgium international footballers
Place of birth missing
Association football midfielders